This is a list of awards and nominations received by South Korean five-member pop rock band F.T. Island, short for Five Treasure Island. The members are

 Choi Min-hwan on drums, 
 Lee Hong-gi as main vocals, and 
 Lee Jae-jin on bass

under FNC Entertainment.

Former members were Song Seung-hyun (2009-2019) on guitar, Oh Won-bin (2007-2009) on guitar, and Choi Jong-hoon (2007-2019) on guitar and keyboard.

Mnet Asian Music Awards
The Mnet Asian Music Awards (abbreviated as a MAMA), formerly "M.net KM Music Festival" (MKMF) (1999 - 2008), is a major K-pop music award show that is held by Mnet Media annually in South Korea. Daesang Award (Grand Prize) is equivalent Artist of the Year.

Mnet 20's Choice Awards
Mnet 20's Choice Awards is presented by South Korean cable television channel Mnet.

Golden Disk Awards

MBC Plus X Genie Music Awards

Awards by year

References

Lists of awards received by South Korean musician
Awards